Ocean Arks was founded in 1981 by John Todd  and Nancy Jack Todd in the United States.

It is a non-profit research and education organization dedicated to the creation and dissemination of the thinking and the technologies fundamental to a sustainable future. Their work includes the living machines which use phytoremediation to clean water of harmful chemicals.

Publications
Annals of Earth

See also 

Sustainability
Biodiversity
Global warming
Ecology
Earth Science
Natural environment
Nature
Recycling

References

Ocean Arks International

Organizations established in 1981
Environmental organizations based in the United States
Entertainment companies of the United States
Companies established in 1981